Mary Figg (born September 25, 1934) is a politician in the American state of Florida. She served in the Florida House of Representatives from 1982 to 1992, representing the 60th district.

References

1934 births
Living people
Members of the Florida House of Representatives
Women state legislators in Florida